The Free port of Vladivostok is a free port, which means a port zone under a special custom and taxation system, with a particular jurisdiction regarding investments. This status has been granted to Vladivostok from 1861 to 1909, and since October 12, 2015.

From 1861 to 1909 

Initially, the regime of free port in Vladivostok has been applied under the Russian Empire from 1861 to 1909. This special status efficiently contributed to the economical development of Vladivostok, which became one of the biggest ports in the world, commensurable to Hamburg or London.

In 1860, in order to develop the Far East, the Russian Government decided to assign the free port status to all the ports of Primoye. In 1900, Sergei Witte, at this time Minister of Finances, canceled the free port regime in Vladivostok, because he thought that it affected the development of the Trans-Siberian Railway, which was designed to unify the Empire. Moreover, even if it had allowed supplying first need products to the settlers in such a remote area as the Russian Far East, the free port regime had a considerable drawback: the supremacy of foreign products over national products in the whole country.

However, facing hard commercial competition with Dalian, which had also been a free port since 1899, Vladivostok got back its status of free port in 1904; it corresponds to the loss of Port Arthur - also a free port - during the Russo-Japanese War. The peace conditions offered by Russia to Japan in 1905 included maintaining the status of free port in Vladivostok.

The need to reduce Japanese influence in the Far East has been the reason invoked by newspapers to push up for the abolition of the free port status in Vladivostok in 1909. Actually, the abolition of the status was already discussed in 1906.

Vladivostok's authorities called many times for the restoration of the free port status, without success.

Free port of 2015

Attribution 
The project was intended to improve the cross-border commerce, to develop the transport infrastructures and to integrate the Primorsky Krai in the world transportation routes; its purpose is also to attract investors, to create a network of logistic centers for transportation, storage and partial transformation of the goods, in order to foster the organisation of local industries working on the exportation of manufactured goods to create added value.

Geography 
The new status will be applied to 15 municipalities of Primorsky Krai. It includes major ports of the South of Russian Far East, from Zarubino to Nakhodka, as well as Vladivostok International Airport.

The free port zone is crossed by the future international transportation corridors "Primorie-1" and "Primorie-2". Their realization would have a significant economical effect on the zone, ensuring transit of goods from North-East of China to the free ports of Russian Far East.

History and legislation 
The federal law N° 473-FZ of December 29 of 2014, prepared by the Minvostokrazvitia allowed to take special measures in order to create a free zone.

In December 2014, Vladimir Putin proposed to grant the status of free port to Vladivostok to the Federal assembly.

The federal law N°212-FZ «of Vladivostok free port» has been signed by the President of the Russian Federation on July 13 of 2015; the law is effective from October 12 of 2015. The law specifies that the free port regime in Vladivostok will last for 70 years, and that the period could be renewed by an additional law.

According to Alexander Galushki, Minister of the Development of Russian Far East, the law has been prepared with the help of representatives of the civil society, experts and entrepreneurs. Tens of public consultations in different places (Moscow, Far East) have been organized, including a lecture at the Civic Chamber of the Russian Federation. All in all, the preparation of the law mobilized more than 700 experts, and many interesting propositions have been taken into account during its writing.

Specificities of the free port 

Vladivostok's free port is ruled by a juridic system benefiting the business and investment activities. Residents of the free port are granted some privileges: light taxation, simplified customs and visa procedures, facilitated administration procedures.

In the free port zone, the following incitations are settled:
 Facilitated visa regime (possibility to get an 8-days visa at the border);
 Modern and fast system of border crossing for international business;
 State support to entrepreneurs in order to attract investments for the development of transport infrastructures, the creation and development of an industry oriented towards export on the Asia-Pacific market;
 Significant reduction of the tax inspection delays;
 Surprise inspections done only with the consent of the company;
 Lowered taxes on income for investors (instead of the usual 20%, 5% during the first 5 years, then 12% during the following 5 years);
 No tax on property or buildings during the first 5 years;
 Especially lowered social welfare contributions on investment projects during the first 10 years (7.6% instead of the usual 30%), decreased tax on mine resources extraction, and accelerated procedure for getting VAT back;
 Creation of a free zone, with possibility of storage for luxury articles, works of art and antiques, to prepare them for sale and sowing to potential buyers.

Projects 
Benefiting the creation of the free port, a zone dedicated to casinos has been opened, with the ambition to make of Vladivostok a gambling place, as a rival of Macau and Busan. In total, 16 hotels and casinos, with side leisure infrastructures (nautical base, ski tracks, etc.) should be built till 2022; part of them should be completed in 2016. The total invested amount represents more than 1.5 billion euros.

Economical forecast 
According to the economical growth assessment made by the experts, the creation of the free port of Vladivostok should lead to an increase of the GRDP of the Primorsky Krai, reaching 2.2 times its initial rate in 2025 (up to 1 400 billion rubles) and 3.4 times in 2034 (up to 2 100 billion rubles). Newly created jobs are also forecasted, up to 84 000 in 2021, 108 000 in 2025, and 468 000 in 2034.

International reactions 
When the project of free port was made public, China considered creating a platform of e-trade in Vladivostok.
During a forum in Vladivostok dedicated to the free port, Japan suggested that trade with Russia could be done in Yen, dropping the Dollar.

Criticisms 
According to the Russian economist and sociologist Vladislav Inozemtsev (Russian), the Russian Far East is not rich enough to constitute an interesting entry point in Russia for investors; the presence of a military fleet base in Vladivostok could be a problem; moreover, Vladivostok is located too close from the Chinese border, and especially from Dalian, also a free port. On another hand, he reproaches that the law lets the possibility to review and cancel the status of free port at any time, which means that stability is not granted for investors.

References

External links 
 Vladivostok free port will have a synergetic effect on other ports of Russian Far East. (Russian)
 10 answers to hot questions regarding Vladivostok free port. (Russian)
 Status of free port, perspective and attempt. (Russian)

Vladivostok
Vladivostok
Economy of Vladivostok
Vladivotok